Pale Horse and Rider was a short-lived collaboration between Jon DeRosa and Marc Gartman. Their recordings featured a variety of performers in supporting roles, including Alan Sparhawk (Low), Nathan Amundson (Rivulets), Charles Newman (Flare, Mother West), Paul Oldham (Palace Brothers) and Mike Pride.

Discography
 The Alcohol EPs (1999)
 These Are the New Good Times (2003)
 Moody Pike (2004)

External links

Pale Horse and Rider interview (June 2002) for QRD

American indie rock groups
Darla Records artists